Hemicriconemoides is a genus of nematodes belonging to the family Criconematidae.

The genus has cosmopolitan distribution.

Species:

Hemicriconemoides affinis 
Hemicriconemoides alexis 
Hemicriconemoides amurensis 
Hemicriconemoides asymmetricus 
Hemicriconemoides brachyuris 
Hemicriconemoides brachyurus 
Hemicriconemoides brevicaudatus 
Hemicriconemoides californianus 
Hemicriconemoides camelliae 
Hemicriconemoides capensis 
Hemicriconemoides cedrusmontanus 
Hemicriconemoides chitwoodi 
Hemicriconemoides cocophillus 
Hemicriconemoides communis 
Hemicriconemoides conicaudatus 
Hemicriconemoides digitatus 
Hemicriconemoides dipterocarpes 
Hemicriconemoides doonensis 
Hemicriconemoides fujianensis 
Hemicriconemoides gabrici 
Hemicriconemoides gaddi 
Hemicriconemoides ghaffari 
Hemicriconemoides insignis 
Hemicriconemoides kanayaensis 
Hemicriconemoides longistylus 
Hemicriconemoides macrodorus 
Hemicriconemoides magnificus 
Hemicriconemoides mangiferae 
Hemicriconemoides mehdii 
Hemicriconemoides microdoratus 
Hemicriconemoides minor 
Hemicriconemoides minutus 
Hemicriconemoides neobrachyurus 
Hemicriconemoides nitidus 
Hemicriconemoides ortonwilliamsi 
Hemicriconemoides paracamelliae 
Hemicriconemoides parasinensis 
Hemicriconemoides parataiwanensis 
Hemicriconemoides parvus 
Hemicriconemoides phoenicis 
Hemicriconemoides promissus 
Hemicriconemoides pseudobrachyurus 
Hemicriconemoides rosae 
Hemicriconemoides rotundoides 
Hemicriconemoides rotundus 
Hemicriconemoides scottolamassesei 
Hemicriconemoides silvaticus 
Hemicriconemoides sinensis 
Hemicriconemoides snoecki 
Hemicriconemoides strictathecatus 
Hemicriconemoides sunderbanensis 
Hemicriconemoides taiwanensis 
Hemicriconemoides variabilis 
Hemicriconemoides varionodus 
Hemicriconemoides wessoni

References

Nematodes